Drapeau is a French surname meaning flag. Notable people with the surname include:

Étienne Drapeau (born 1978), retired Canadian ice hockey player
Jean Drapeau, CC, GOQ (1916–1999), Canadian lawyer and politician who served as mayor of Montreal
Joseph Drapeau (1752–1810), seigneur, merchant and political figure in Lower Canada
Joseph-Napoléon Drapeau, Canadian politician
Scott Drapeau (born 1972), American basketball player

See also
Jean-Drapeau (Montreal Metro), station on the Yellow Line of the Montreal Metro rapid transit system
, recitation with orchestral accompaniment written by the English composer Edward Elgar in 1917
Parc Jean-Drapeau, Montreal, Quebec, Canada, in the Saint Lawrence River

French-language surnames
Surnames of French origin